Mala Jasikova is a village located in the city of Zaječar, Serbia. According to the 2011 census, the village has a population of 212 inhabitants.

Gallery

References

Populated places in Zaječar District